APc-1-class small coastal transports were a troopship design used during World War 2 for the United States Navy (USN). These ships were assigned to the Pacific War where they transported supplies, personnel and munitions around the Island hopping campaign. Many of the ships were under threat of air, sea and submarine attack. A few ships of the class received battle stars for combat valor, including USS APc-15, USS APc-22, USS APc-25 and USS APc-26. The wooden-hulled ships were built by many different shipyards. Following the war, many of them were converted to fishing vessels.

Design 
The design is based on the wooden-hulled USN AMc . The USN Chief of Naval Operations gave the order for the construction of 50 AMc coastal minesweepers, AMc-150–AMc-199 on January 19, 1942. The coastal minesweepers design was modified, as the need for a small coastal transports was great at the time. The Bureau of Ships issued the specifications for the modified coastal minesweepers design for ships AMc 150–AMc-199 in February 1942. The Chief of Naval Operations issued the request that the 50 ships be constructed as "raider transports, AP," for use in the South Pacific War on April 13, 1942. Many planned and under construction AMc coastal minesweepers were changed to APc small coastal transports. Of the many APc-1-class small coastal transports built, ten ships, APc-85 to APc-94, were transferred to work in the United States Atlantic Fleet. Some were transfer to the United Kingdom under the Lend-Lease act. After the war the USN converted some to personnel ferries with a capacity of up to 250 persons by removing some of the open sea ballast and removal of deck guns. Many after the war were sold to be fishing boats. The specifications for modified coastal minesweepers redesign, where given by the District Craft Development Board on April 20, 1942, The redesign gave three planned uses for new APc transport ships:

 Transportation of two officers and 74 men (possibly a raiding party) for maximum for each of 24 hours.

Description
For service electrical need the ships had two diesel 30 kW 120V DC service generators. The ships had a large boom with a capacity of 3 tons to load and unload cargo. Ships were armed with two Oerlikon 20 mm cannon.

Shipyards
Many of the APc transport ships were built by small shipyards and boatyards that switched from yacht, sailboat and powerboat building to military construction.

APc transport ships were built in 1942 and 1943 by:
 Nathanael Greene Herreshoff in Bristol, Rhode Island
 Fulton Shipyard in Antioch, California
 Cryer & Sons in Oakland, California
 Warren Boat Yard in Warren, Rhode Island
 Camden Shipbuilding in Camden, Maine
 Hodgdon Yachts in Boothbay, Maine
 Anderson & Cristofani in San Francisco, California
Lynch Shipbuilding in San Diego, California
 Harry G. Marr in Damariscotta, Maine
 W. A. Robinson, Inc. in Ipswich, Massachusetts
 Bristol Yachts in Seekonk, Massachusetts
 Noank Shipbuilding in Noank, Connecticut

Notable ships
, built by Camden Ship Building.
, built by Hodgdon Brothers, sank December 17, 1943 during landing in the Battle of Arawe, was struck by a bomb during an enemy air attack off Arawe, New Britain. 	 
, built by Fulton Shipyard, renamed Cape Scott then  Cape Cross.

Ships in class
APc-80 to APc-84, APc-104 to APc-107, APc-112 to APc-115, APc-99 and APc-100 were canceled before construction started.

See also
Wooden boats of World War 2

References

External links

APc-1-class small coastal transports
Auxiliary ship classes
Auxiliary ship classes of the United States Navy